Ramirez may refer to:

People
Ramírez (surname), people with the surname Ramírez
Ramirez (Brazilian footballer) (born 1987), full name Washington Ramirez Cruz Santos, Brazilian footballer

Locations
Ramirez, Texas
Ramirez Canyon Park, Malibu, California
Ramirez Island,Chile
Diego Ramírez Islands, Chile
Ramirez, a barangay of Magallanes, Cavite

Companies
Conservas Ramirez, a Portuguese canned fish producer company
Ramírez Guitars, Spanish luthiers

Other
Juan Sánchez Villa-Lobos Ramírez, a character from the Highlander film series
Ramirez (Skies of Arcadia), a character from the video game Skies of Arcadia